The following lists events that happened during 1820 in Chile.

Incumbents
Supreme Director of Chile: Bernardo O'Higgins

Events

February
3-4 February - Capture of Valdivia
18 February - Battle of Agüi

March
6 March - Battle of El Toro

August
20 August - The Freedom Expedition of Perú sails for Paracas.

September
22 September - Battle of Pangal
26 September - Battle of Tarpellanca

November
25 November - Battle of Las Vegas de Talcahuano
27 November - Battle of Alameda de Concepcion

Births
Date unknown - Silvestre Ochagavía Errázuriz, deputy for Santiago
16 August - Jacinto Chacón, deputy for Santiago (died 1893)

Deaths
28 September - Pedro Andrés del Alcázar (born 1752)
December - Pedro de Vivar (born 1742)

References 

 
1820s in Chile
Chile
Chile